Carlos (born Yvan-Chrysostome Dolto; February 20, 1943 — January 17, 2008) was a French singer, entertainer and actor. He is sometimes called Jean-Christophe Doltovitch.

Biography
He was the son of the psychoanalyst Françoise Dolto and the physiotherapist Boris Dolto (born Doltovitch) a Russian migrant from Crimea. He also obtained a diploma in 1961 at l’École française d'orthopédie et de masso-kinésithérapie, headed by his father.

At the age of 14 he met Johnny Hallyday, who befriended him. He was renamed Carlos in 1958, in homage to the percussionist Carlos "Patato" Valdes. He then became Hallyday's artistic assistant. From 1962 to 1972, he was Sylvie Vartan's artistic assistant, and it was he and Vartan who discovered Mike Brant, whom they brought to France in 1969.

Carlos was heavily overweight and cultivated a jovial countenance, and adopted a look similar to the singer Antoine, with leis and Hawaiian shirts.

In 1988, he was named the mascot of the amusement park Mirapolis, open in the Val-d'Oise, which quickly went bankrupt. He ran for office in the local elections in Courdimanche in 1989, but was not elected. He regularly participated in the radio program Les Grosses Têtes of Philippe Bouvard and had his own cartoon, Around the World in Eighty Dreams (Les aventures de Carlos), in 1992. He was also the narrator of the French version of Fat Albert and the Cosby Kids (T'as l'bonjour d'Albert). From 2000 to 2007, he directed documentary films for the series Le Gros homme et la Mer (The Fat Man and the Sea), for the stations Odyssée and Voyage.

Carlos died in January 2008 of a liver cancer in Clichy and was buried in Bourg-la-Reine cemetery beside his mother, Françoise Dolto, and his father, Boris Dolto.

Discography
  À faire danser les Antilles (1983)
  À la queue leu leu (1974)
  Ali Baba (1971)
  Allez la France (1998)
  Animal parade (1971)
  Arriba Sevillana (1986)
  Arriba Sevillana (Version maxi) (1986)
  Avec elle (1991)
  Baby bla-bla (Susanne) (1984)
  Bakana (Bakala Nanu Meme) (1977)
  Balade animée (1991)
  Bamba Carlos (1976)
  Barbe Bleue (with Chantal Goya) (1978)
  Big bisou (part I) (1977)
  Big bisou (part II) (1977)
  Big bisou (version intégrale) (1977)
  Big bisous (version 1993)
  Big bisous (version 97) (1997)
  Bonsoir Véronique (1980)
  Boum boum (1997)
  C'est bon (salsa) (1980)
  C'est la faute à Dagobert (1970)
  C'est pas du tout cuit (1972)
  C'est pas parce qu'on est grand (1977)
  C'est toujours occupé (1977)
  Canon (1991)
  Captain Carlos (1986)
  Carlos à Saint-André-les-Alpes (1981)
  Carlos Colomb (1978)
  Carlos lapin (1970)
  Carlostenstrasse (1976)
  Cha cha chaud (version 1998) (1998)
  Cocotte en papier (1974)
  Cocotte en papier (version 1998) (1998)
  Cocotte en papier (Version single) (1974)
  Colucci (1997)
  Crazy Joe (1974)
  Crésus et Roméo (duo with Joe Dassin) (1974)
  Croak the monster (1980)
  Cuentame (Cha-cha-cha) / Cha cha chaud (1977)
  Dame tartine (1988)
  Dédé Bilo (1984)
  Demandez-moi ce que vous voulez (1974)
  Des week-ends de sept jours (1976)
  Dis bonjour au Monsieur, dis bonjour à la dame (1978)
  Dis moi Monsieur Carlos (1994)
  Dis pourquoi papa (1980)
  Docteur Boogie (1981)
  Eh dis Père Noël (1991)
  El rey (1986)
  Elle m'emballait (1991)
  Epilogue (1974)
  Eso es el amor (Ah lachez-moi !) (version intégrale) (1979)
  Est-ce que j'ai une tête à chanter des chansons d'amour ? (1976)
  Fanfan la fanfare (1e partie) (1983)
  Fanfan la fanfare (2e partie) (1983)
  Faut s'éclater (1982)
  Fiou d'elle (1986)
  Gargantua (1988)
  Gros nounours (1985)
  Happiness (1970)
  Idého (1991)
  Intro(1974)
  J'fais rien qu'à faire des bêtises (Duo with Alice Dona) (1974)
  J'suis un rigolo (after I'm Just A Gigolo by Louis Prima) (version 1993)
  Jamais sans mes potes (1997)
  Je m'balade (1976)
  Je rêve des petits hommes verts (1978)
  Je suis indécis (hou la la) (1978)
  Je suis trop sentimental (1981)
  Je suis un magicien (1976)
  Je suis un rigolo / Fou le boogie (1981)
  Je viens de la part de ma cousine (1970)
  Kangourou (1984)
  L'amour ça rend beau les laids (version 1998) (1998)
  L'amour ça rend bô lélé (1987)
  L'amour con g (1996)
  L'année des nanas (1975)
  L'auto du papa de Toto (1979)
  La Bamboula (1974)
  La Bamboula (version 1993)
  La cantine (1973)
  La cantine (version 1993)
  La chanson des cromagnons (1981)
  La cigale et la fourmi (with Sylvie Vartan)
  La Coladeira (2001)
  La danse pour faire bébé (1996)
  La demoiselle de déshonneur (1974)
  La demoiselle de déshonneur (version 1998) (1998)
  La divine sieste de papa (1986)
  La fête à bicyclette (1997)
  La France le matin (1973)
  La France le matin (version 1993)
  La leçon de square-dance (with Gédéon) (1980)
  La maison en chocolat (1980)
  La pêche au gros (1986)
  La reine du shopping (1970)
  La smala (1974)
  La vie est belle (1970)
  Le berger des Folies-bergères (1976)
  Le bougalou du loup-garou (1973)
  Le bougalou du loup-garou (1976)
  Le bougalou du loup-garou (1993)
  Le bus (1974)
  Le copain des enfants (1972)
  Le Kankondanse (1984)
  Le kikouyou (1991)
  Le mignon petit canard (1976)
  Le Père Noël a disparu (1970)
  Le Père Noël du supermarché (1978)
  Le petit baisenville (with the group Il était une fois) (1974)
  Le rigolo (1997)
  Le tiercé (1974)
  Le tiercé (version 1993)
  Le tiercé (version single) (1974)
  Le tirelipimpon (version courte) (1989)
  Le tirelipimpon (version longue) (1989)
  Les canaris (1977)
  Les Croisades (1975)
  Les pauvres papas (1981)
  Les pieds bleus (1974)
  Les premiers sont les bonnets d'âne (1977)
  Les rues de Saint-Germain (1994)
  Les têtards (1991)
  Ma Corrida (1981)
  Ma gym en musique (1980)
  Maguy (1981)
  Malabar et Roudoudou (1974)
  Mama Panama (1982)
  Manger un croissant (1974)
  Mario mon coco (1982)
  Marourou Tahiti (Merci Tahiti) (1986)
  Maxwell (1991)
  Medley (1993)
  Medley 98 (1998)
  Mets ton doigt dans le vent (1979)
  Miam Miam (1981)
  Mille coups de cœur (1986)
  Moi y'a bobo (1976)
  Mon royaume pour une femme (1974)
  Nostracarlus (1981)
  Ô Zitouna (1973)
  Ô Zitouna (version 1998) (1998)
  Oh yé (Oye) (1986)
  On est foutus on mange trop (based on the Papa Mambo of Alain Souchon) (1979)
  On est tous des clowns (1974)
  One Man Slow (Moi, moi, moi) (1984)
  Ouvre ta maison (1970)
  P'tite fleur fanée (1986)
  Papa Mambo (version courte) (1979)
  Papa Mambo (version intégrale) (1979)
  Papayou (1983)
  Papayou (version 1993)
  Papoudoux (1997)
  Pare-chocs (1991)
  Pas assez beau (1998)
  Pas grandi (1982)
  Petit a (1980)
  Petit Jean (1980)
  Ping-pong (1980)
  Pourvou que ça doure (1981)
  Privé d'enfance (1997)
  Professeur Carlos (1976)
  Qu'est-ce qu'on était heureux en 1932 (1970)
  Réfléchis (1981)
  Rosalie (détourné plus tard dans la publicité pour le jus de fruit Oasis (Qu'est-ce que tu bois Dou Dou, dis donc ?) (1978)
  Rosalie (biguine) (1978)
  Rosalie (version 1993)
  Rosalie (version 1998) (1998)
  Rosalie (version longue durée)
  S.O.S (tendresse) (1981)
  Savez-vous comment danser ? (1979)
  Se ranger des ecritures (1974)
  Señor météo (1974)
  Señor météo (version 1993)
  Si j'étais président (1976)
  Si je maigris (1981)
  Si tu ne m'attendais pas (1974)
  Si tu vas Dario (1991)
  Susanna
  T'as l'béguin d'la béguine (1984)
  T'as l'bonjour d'Albert (1985)
  T'es bon public (1976)
  Tcha-tcha (1987)
  Tibou d'caoutchouc (1997)
  Tous les enfants vont chanter (1980)
  Tout nu, tout bronzé (version 1993)
  Tout nu, tout bronzé (1973)
  Trempe ton cul (1997)
  Tropical nanas (1986)
  Tubes à boum (1984)
  Un garçon comfortable (1972)
  Viens chez Roger (1974)
  Viens dans mon igloo (1974)
  Vive les grands Bretons (1976)
  Y'a des indiens partout (1970)
  Y'a des indiens partout (version 1993)
  Y'a plus de papas, y'a plus de mamans (1979)

Filmography 

 1964 : Patate of Robert Thomas : le copain d'Alexa
 1971 : Le Cri du cormoran le soir au-dessus des jonques of Michel Audiard : Purcell
 1979 : Je te tiens, tu me tiens par la barbichette of Jean Yanne : Condom

Television

 1992 : Les Aventures de Carlos
 1992 : Faux-Frère
 1992–1996 : Le Jap

Bibliography
Carlos (1996). Je m'appelle Carlos. Paris: Ramsay.
Carlos (1997). Les meilleures histoires drôles de Carlos. Paris: Ramsay.
Carlos (2001). Le bêtisier des bêtisiers. Paris: Archipel.

References

External links
 Official website
 Le chanteur Carlos est mort, Le Monde, January 17, 2008
 

1943 births
2008 deaths
Singers from Paris
French pop singers
French people of Russian descent
20th-century French male singers
Deaths from cancer in France
Deaths from liver cancer